The Ministerial Salaries Consolidation Act 1965 for United Kingdom legislation was a British Act of Parliament. It repealed the Ministers of the Crown Act 1937, which is notable for first providing a legal definition of the Leader of the Opposition.

References

Government of the United Kingdom
United Kingdom Acts of Parliament 1965